The mines on the Italian front during the First World War comprised a series of underground explosive charges of varying sizes, secretly planted between 1916 and 1918 by Austro-Hungarian and Italian tunneling units beneath their enemy's lines along the Italian front in the Dolomite section of the Alps.

Background
From 1915, the high peaks of the Dolomites range were an area of fierce mountain warfare. In order to protect their soldiers from enemy fire and the hostile alpine environment, both Austro-Hungarian and Italian military engineers constructed fighting tunnels which offered a degree of cover and allowed better logistics support. In addition to building underground shelters and covered supply routes for their soldiers (like the Italian Strada delle 52 Gallerie), both sides also attempted to break the stalemate of trench warfare by tunneling under no man's land and laying large quantities of explosives beneath the enemy's positions.

Between 1 January 1916 and 13 March 1918, a total of 34 mines were detonated in this theatre of war. Of these, 20 were Italian mines aimed at Austro-Hungarian targets and 14 were Austro-Hungarian mines aimed at Italian targets. The largest Italian mine held  of explosive.

 
Focal points of the underground fighting during the War in the Dolomites were Pasubio with 10 mines, Lagazuoi with 5, Col di Lana/Monte Sief also with 5, and Marmolada with 4 mines. The most intense episode was the seven-week period from 16 September to 3 November 1917 which saw 12 mine explosions. After November 1917 and the Italian retreat to Monte Grappa and the Piave river in the aftermath of the Battle of Caporetto, Pasubio with its elevation of  remained the only underground war area on the Austro-Italian front.

Unlike the mining efforts on the Western Front, where e.g. the mines on the first day of the Somme (1916) were constructed in a chalk and flint area and where e.g. the mines in the Battle of Messines (1917) were constructed in geology dominated by wet sand and clay, the mine galleries on the Austro-Italian front had to be executed at high altitudes in the hard carbonate rock of the Dolomites using hand-operating drilling machines and chisels. Fighting under these conditions, often in exposed areas near mountain peaks and even in glacial ice, required extreme skill of both Austro-Hungarian and Italian miners.

List of the mines

1916

1917

1918

Gallery

Popular culture
The Austro-Hungarian and Italian mining efforts in the high mountain peaks of the Italian front were portrayed in fiction in Luis Trenker's film Mountains on Fire of 1931.

See also

 Mines on the first day of the Somme (1916) 
 Mines in the Battle of Messines (1917)
 White War

References

Books

External links

 Robert Striffler, Die 34 Minensprengungen an der Tiroler Gebirgsfront 1916-1918 (1993), online here and here (German)
 Der Pasubio und die 59er (German article on the 59th Austrian Infantry Regiment „Archduke Rainer“)
 Simon Jones, Col di Lana and Monte Sief (battlefield imagery) 
 Positions on the Col di Lana, 1915
 Plan of the Italian mine fired on Col di Lana, 1916 (1)
 Plan of the Italian mine fired on Col di Lana, 1916 (2)
 View of the access to the Italian mine fired on Col di Lana, 1916 
 Plan of the Austro-Hungarian  tunnel system on Monte Sief
 Plan of the Austro-Hungarian  tunnel system on Pasubio
 Serauta monumental area

Explosions in 1916
Explosions in 1917
Explosions in 1918
Conflicts in 1916
Conflicts in 1917
Conflicts in 1918
Tunnel warfare in World War I
Austria-Hungary in World War I
Military history of Italy during World War I
Italian front (World War I)